Lasse Veli Oka (31 July 1923 – 1 July 2007) was a Finnish diplomat and economist. He was the Finnish Consul General to Los Angeles 1983–1985 and Finnish Ambassador to Bogota 1985–1988.

References 

Ambassadors of Finland to Colombia
1923 births
2007 deaths
Finnish expatriates in the United States